Minador do Negrão is a municipality located in the Brazilian state of Alagoas. Its population is 5,322 (2020) and its area is 167 km².

References

Municipalities in Alagoas